Lamba is an Indian surname found among Jats of Haryana Punjab and Delhi. Notable people bearing the surname include:  
    
Ankit Lamba, Indian cricketer
Arfi Lamba, Indian-born actor, producer, entertainer, philosopher, and humanist
Dinesh Lamba, Indian film actor
Isaac Chikwekwere Lamba, Malawian diplomat
Jacqueline Lamba, French artist
Mallika Sherawat (born Reema Lamba), Indian actor
Minissha Lamba, Indian actress
Raman Lamba, Indian cricketer
Sunil Lamba, former Indian Navy Chief
Vinay Lamba, Indian cricketer

Indian surnames
Punjabi-language surnames
Surnames of Indian origin
Hindu surnames
Khatri clans
Khatri surnames
Jat clans of Punjab